The Texas Premier Soccer League (TPSL) is a men's outdoor soccer league that was formed in 2013 consisting of amateur soccer club sides across the state. 2015/16 will be the third full season of play for the league.

Five new clubs joined to play in the new 2015/16 season. Temple United FC, Brownsville Bravos FC, San Antonio Generals, Dallas Clash and Austin Lonestrikers. Galveston & Rancheros dropped out from the league after the conclusion of the 2014/15 season. Texas Timberz have taken a 1-year hiatus but will participate in the end of season US Club Soccer Texas State Cup.

2015/16 teams

Fixtures

Regular Season Results

Regular Season Standings

Playoffs

Championship final

Lamar Hunt U.S. Open Cup 

In season 2015/16, Austin Real Cuauhtemoc (ARC) entered qualification for the 2016 competition and played their match with NTX Rayados in Georgetown, Texas on November 1. The game ended in a 4–2 loss for the TPSL side.

US Club Soccer Texas State Cup

Round 1

 Dates to be confirmed

References

External links 
 Texas Premier Soccer League Official Website
 Houston Hurricanes FC Official Website
 Region3Soccer.com 
 Twin Cities FC 
 Texas Timberz FC 
 ARC FC 
 Temple United FC

Soccer in Texas
2015 in sports in Texas
2016 in sports in Texas